The 2004 Tour de Langkawi was the 9th edition of the Tour de Langkawi, a cycling stage race that took place in Malaysia. It began on 6 February in Bayan Baru and ended on 15 February in Merdeka Square, Kuala Lumpur. In fact, this race was rated by the Union Cycliste Internationale (UCI) as a 2.2 category race.

Fredy González of Colombia won the race, followed by Ryan Cox of South Africa second and Dave Bruylandts of Belgium third. Gordon Fraser of Australia won the points classification category and Ruber Marín of Colombia won the mountains classification category.  won the team classification category.

Stages
The cyclists competed in 12 stages, covering a distance of 1,242.9 kilometres.

Classification leadership

Final standings

General classification

Points classification

Mountains classification

Asian rider classification

Team classification

Asian team classification

List of teams and riders
A total of 20 teams were invited to participate in the 2004 Tour de Langkawi. Out of the 140 riders, a total of 121 riders made it to the finish in Kuala Lumpur.

 
  Luciano Pagliarini
  Wladimir Belli
  Matteo Carrara
  Marco Pinotti
  Alessandro Cortinovis
  Sergio Barbero
  Michele Scotto D'abusco
 Chocolade Jacques-Wincor Nixdorf
  Jans Koerts
  Dave Bruylandts
  Mauricio Ardila
  Andoni Aranaga
  Zbigniew Piątek
  Jan Van Velzen
  Jurgen Van de Walle
 
  Fredy González
  Ruber Marín
  Urbelino Mesa
  Marlon Pérez Arango
  José Rujano
  Russel Van Hout
  Trent Wilson
 De-Nardi
  Graziano Gasparre
  Michele Gobbi
  Enrico Grigoli
  Devis Miorin
  Rafael Nuritdinov
  Antonio Rizzi
  Charly Wegelius
 
  Jeremy Hunt
  Kurt Van De Wouwer
  Frédéric Gabriel
  Peter Wuyts
  Michel Van Haecke
  Gert Vanderaerden
  Ben Day

 
  Fortunato Baliani
  Graeme Brown
  Alejandro Borrajo
  Sergiy Matveyev
  Fabio Gilioli
  Guillermo Bongiorno
  Brett Lancaster
 Formaggi Pinzolo Fiave
  Ivan Quaranta
  Mario Manzoni
  Corrado Serina
  Giulini Sulpizi
  Domenico Gualdi
  Matteo Cappe
  Luis Felipe Laverde
 
  Xavier Florencio
  Santiago Blanco Gil
  Moises Duenas Nevado
  Johan Vansummeren
  Hector Guerra Garcia
  Nácor Burgos
  Oscar Laguna Garcia
 
  David George
  Enrico Degano
  Sean Sullivan
  Ryan Cox
  Jock Green
  James Lewis Perry
  Tiaan Kannemeyer
 
  Gordon Fraser
  Gregory Henderson
  Brice Jones
  Danny Pate
  John Lieswyn
  Scott Moninger
  Michael Sayers

 Bert Story-Piels
  Germ van der Burg
  Dennis van Uden
  Coen Loos
  Reinier Honig
  Jasper Lenferink
  Jarko van der Stelt
  Arne Kornegoor
 Wismilak
  Tonton Susanto
  Sama'i Sama'i
  Wawan Setyobudi
  Matnur Matnur
  Ano Pedersen
  Scott Guyton
  Christopher Bradford
 Japan
  Yoshiyuki Abe
  Kazuyuki Manabe
  Shinichi Fukushima
  Kazuya Okazaki
  Makoto Iijima
  Tomoya Kano
  Yasutaka Tashiro
 Canada
  Roland Green
  Eric Wohlberg
  Dominique Perras
  Charles Dionne
  Cory Lange
  Peter Wedge
  Alexandre Lavallée
 Iran
  Hassan Maleki
  Ahad Kazemi
  Ghader Mizbani
  Abbas Saeidi Tanha
  Mohammad Rajabloo
  Amir Zargari
  Saeid Chehrzad

 China
  Wang Guozhang
  Luo Jianshi
  Zheng Xiaohai
  Li Fuyu
  Zhu Yongbiao
  Shao Xiaojun
  Jiang Xueli
 Malaysia
  Shahrulneeza Razali
  Mohd Mahadzir Hamad
  Musairi Musa
  Mohd Najmee Abd Ghani
  Mohd Sazlee Ismail
  Nor Effendy Rosli
  Mohd Sayuti Mohd Zahit
 South Africa
  Jaco Odenaal
  Ian McLeod
  Daryl Impey
  Reinhardt Duplessis
  Nicholas White
  Jeremy Maartens
  Neil McDonald
 Republic of Ireland
  David McCann
  David O'Loughlin
  Philip Deignan
  Denis Lynch
  Paul Griffin
  Eugene Moriarty
  Tim Barry
 Pagcor-Casino Filipino
  Victor Espiritu
  Rhyan Tanguilig
  Lloyd Lucien Reynante
  Merculio Ramos
  Alfie Catalan
  Albert Primero
  Ronald Gorantes

References

2004
2004 in road cycling
2004 in Malaysian sport